The 2010 CRC Season was the second season of the Canadian Rugby Championship.  This was the first year when instead of the CRC Champion advancing to the Americas Rugby Championship, a Canada Selects team was chosen from players participating in the tournament to go on and represent Canada at the international tournament.  This was also the first season that included a post-season to decide the winner of the MacTier Cup.

The 2010 Canadian Rugby Championship champions were The Rock, who defeated the Prairie Wolf Pack 19–8, in the nationally televised final.

Pre-season 
There was no formal pre-season that the league put in place, so several teams played exhibition games against touring sides in order to prepare themselves for the season.

Scores

Regular season

Structure 
The round-robin structure with four teams participating in a round-robin format, each team playing against each other team once stayed the same from the previous season, again with no divisions or conferences.  There were six games in total.

Standings

Fixtures

Postseason 
This was the first year with a postseason, with the second place regular season team visiting the first place team at home, for a final. The final had the Rock beat the Prairie Wolf Pack 19–8 at home, winning their first ever MacTier Cup. The game was broadcast live on CBC, the first CRC game to ever be shown on live nationwide TV.

See also 
Canadian Rugby Championship
Americas Rugby Championship
Rugby Canada

External links
www.canadianrugbychampionship.com

Canadian Rugby Championship seasons
CRC
Canada